National Tertiary Route 311, or just Route 311 (or ) is a National Road Route of Costa Rica, located in the San José province.

Description
In San José province the route covers Santa Ana canton (Santa Ana, Salitral districts).

References

Highways in Costa Rica